Kanchi Singh (born 27 March 1996) is an Indian television actress. She is known for portraying Gayatri Deora in StarPlus's Yeh Rishta Kya Kehlata Hai and Avni Khandelwal in Aur Pyaar Ho Gaya.

Acting career

2002–2012: Early works

Singh began her journey into television as she featured in a small role as child artist for the television series Kutumb in 2003 at the age of 9. However, she took a break from acting to focus on her further studies.

Eight years later, Singh made a comeback at the age of 17 with Colors TV's Sasural Simar Ka in 2011 wherein she played Cherry Bharadwaj, a member of the male lead's family. As there were not many scenes for her in it, she made an exit from it in 2012.<ref>{{cite web|url=http://www.dnaindia.com/entertainment/report-my-character-is-like-ddljs-simran-kanchi-singh-1929334|title=My character is like 'DDLJs Simran: Kanchi Singh — Latest News & Updates at Daily News & Analysis|date=4 December 2013|publisher=}}</ref>

2014–present: Breakthrough

The breakthrough for Singh came in December 2013 as she joined Zee TV's January 2014-starting series Aur Pyaar Ho Gaya as Avni Khandelwal, a girl belonging to a Rajasthani business family opposite Mishkat Varma. She was noticed for her performance, before it went off culmination in December 2014.

Post her breakthrough Singh became a part for an episode of Pyaar Tune Kya Kiya as Veebha opposite Rohit Suchanti in the ending month of Aur Pyaar Ho Gaya and then an episode of Bhakton Ki Bhakti Mein Shakti on Life OK as Hansa.

In 2016, Singh signed Star Plus' longest-running drama Yeh Rishta Kya Kehlata Hai portraying the parallel lead Gayatri "Gayu" Deora, alongside Mohsin Khan and Fahad Ali.

In 2018, Singh appeared on the reality series Box Cricket League to play for Lucknow Nawabs. A year later, she took participation in Kitchen Champion 5 on Colors along with Rohan Mehra.

Personal life
Singh was dating her co-star Rohan Mehra of Yeh Rishta Kya Kehlata Hai'' since 2016, but they reportedly broke up in 2021.

Television

See also 
 List of Indian television actresses

References

External links 

 
 

Indian television actresses
Indian soap opera actresses
1996 births
Living people
Actresses from Indore